The 1988–89 FA Cup was the 108th season of the world's oldest football knockout competition, The Football Association Challenge Cup, or FA Cup for short.

First round proper

Teams from the Football League Third and Fourth Division entered in this round plus Enfield, Telford United, Maidstone United and Bath City, were given byes. The first round of games were played over the weekend 19–20 November 1988, with most replays being played on 22–23 November. All other replays were played on 28 November.

Second round proper

The second round of games were played over 10–11 December 1988, with the first round of replays being played on 13–14 December. The Aldershot-Bristol City game went to two more replays.

Third round proper

Teams from the Football League First and Second Division entered in this round. The third round of games in the FA Cup were played over the weekend 7–8 January 1989, with the first set of replays being played on 10–11 January. Two games went to second replays, and one to a third replay.

Fourth round proper
The fourth round of games were played over the weekend 28–29 January 1989, with replays being played on 31 January – 1 February.

Fifth round proper

The fifth set of games were played over the weekend 18–19 February 1989, with replay being played on 22 February.

Sixth round proper

Most of the sixth round of FA Cup games were played over the weekend 18–19 March 1989, with a replay on 22 March.

Third Division Brentford's impressive cup run was ended by a 4–0 defeat at Liverpool, who were chasing the double.

Wimbledon's defence of the trophy ended with a 1–0 defeat at Everton.

West Ham United, struggling in the league but thriving in the cup competitions (as League Cup semi-finalists), surrendered their chances of FA Cup glory with a 3-1 replay defeat to Norwich City following a goalless draw in the first game.

Nottingham Forest kept alive their outside chances of a unique domestic treble by winning 1–0 against Manchester United, who lost their own last chance of silverware in a season in which they had failed to feature in the title race.

Semi-finals
The FA Cup semi-finals were scheduled for 15 April 1989 and this would be the last year that both games were scheduled to be held simultaneously on a Saturday afternoon with a 3pm kick off. The Everton–Norwich City game was completed as expected; however, the Liverpool–Nottingham Forest game was abandoned after six minutes due to the Hillsborough Disaster which claimed 94 lives on 15 April 1989 (the final death toll was 97). There was talk that the competition for this season would be abandoned, but on 30 April, it was confirmed that both teams would continue in the competition and play in a rescheduled semi-final, which was replayed on 7 May and won 3–1 by Liverpool.

Norwich's hopes of a first-ever FA Cup final were ended as Everton beat them 1–0 to book the second all-Merseyside FA Cup final in four seasons.

Final

The second all-Merseyside FA Cup final in four seasons ended like the previous one, with Liverpool beating Everton and Ian Rush scoring twice, although this time the scoreline was 3–2 rather than 3–1.

A fourth-minute goal from John Aldridge handed the initiative to Liverpool, but a late equaliser by Stuart McCall forced extra-time. Ian Rush restored Liverpool's lead five minutes into extra time, before Stuart McCall's second goal drew the scores level after 102 minutes. However, a second goal from Ian Rush came just two minutes later, and the trophy went to Anfield.

As a tribute to the fans who had died in the Hillsborough disaster, both teams wore black armbands and observed a minute's silence prior to the match.

Television coverage
The BBC had all rights to show FA Cup games. They were able to show one live game from Round 3 onwards as part of Match of the Day Live. They were also able to show highlights of games from Round 1 onwards on Match of the Day.
These matches were.

Match of the Day was due to show highlights of both FA Cup Semi-finals, but this was cancelled due to the Hillsborough disaster.  The rescheduled Liverpool vs Nottingham Forest match was shown live and highlights of the other semi final between Everton and Norwich, which coincided with the Hillsborough disaster, were not shown until the build-up coverage on the day of the final.

See also
 1988–89 WFA Cup

References

External links
The FA Cup at TheFA.com
FA Cup at BBC.co.uk
FA Cup news at Reuters.co.uk

 
FA Cup seasons
Fa Cup, 1988-89
1988–89 domestic association football cups